= Selah Victor =

American actress and comics writer

Selah Victor is a voice actress who voiced Chloe in Miraculous.
